The 2008–09 season was ES Sétif's 39th season in the Algerian top flight. They competed in National 1, the CAF Confederation Cup and the Algerian Cup.

Squad list
Players and squad numbers last updated on 1 September 2008.Note: Flags indicate national team as has been defined under FIFA eligibility rules. Players may hold more than one non-FIFA nationality.

Competitions

Overview

{| class="wikitable" style="text-align: center"
|-
!rowspan=2|Competition
!colspan=8|Record
!rowspan=2|Started round
!rowspan=2|Final position / round
!rowspan=2|First match	
!rowspan=2|Last match
|-
!
!
!
!
!
!
!
!
|-
| National

|  
| style="background:gold;"|Winner
| 8 August 2008
| 28 May 2009
|-
| Algerian Cup

| Round of 64
| Semi-finals
| 15 January 2009
| 23 April 2009
|-
| Confederation Cup

| First round
| Play-off round
| 13 March 2009
| 31 May 2009
|-
| Arab Champions League

| Round 32
| Semi finals
| 28 October 2009
| 26 April 2009
|-
! Total

National

League table

Results summary

Results by round

Matches

Algerian Cup

Confederation Cup

First round

Second round

Play-off round

Arab Champions League

Round 32

Round 16

Quarter finals

Semi finals

Squad information

Playing statistics

|-
! colspan=14 style=background:#dcdcdc; text-align:center| Goalkeepers

|-
! colspan=14 style=background:#dcdcdc; text-align:center| Defenders

|-
! colspan=14 style=background:#dcdcdc; text-align:center| Midfielders

|-
! colspan=14 style=background:#dcdcdc; text-align:center| Forwards

|-
! colspan=14 style=background:#dcdcdc; text-align:center| Players transferred out during the season

Goalscorers
Includes all competitive matches. The list is sorted alphabetically by surname when total goals are equal.

Transfers

In

Out

References

ES Sétif seasons
ES Setif